Born Free is the eighth studio album by American musician Kid Rock. It was released on November 16, 2010 with the title track as its lead single.

The country-oriented album was produced by Rick Rubin featuring several high-profile artists such as T.I., Sheryl Crow, and Bob Seger. This is Kid Rock's first, and to date, only album not to feature a Parental Advisory sticker and is his first all-country album. It is also the first album since 1993's The Polyfuze Method not to feature his backing band Twisted Brown Trucker. Marlon Young is the only member from Twisted Brown Trucker to perform on the album. Kid Rock describes it as "very organic blues-based rock and roll". Cable network TBS used the title track, "Born Free", for its coverage of the 2010 Major League Baseball postseason. As of June 16, 2011 Born Free is certified Platinum by the RIAA for shipments in excess of one million copies. This gave Kid Rock his sixth Platinum album certification in the US. A Michigan only promotion was released with the album. It was a 4-song EP called Racing Father Time.

Release and promotion
The album's lead single was the title track. The songs promotional push included being the theme for the MLB Playoffs, European Music Awards and the CMA Festival. He also performed "Times Like These" at the American Music Awards and "Care" at the Rally for Sanity. This led to a debut of 189,000 copies sold and landing at number five on the billboard top 200. VH-1 aired the Isle of Malta concert special. The following single "God Bless Saturday" became the secondary theme song for ESPN's College Game Day. The third single "Collide" saw him reunite with Sheryl Crow with whom he previously recorded his 2002 single "Picture" and went on a joint tour with. "Purple Sky" failed to chart and the final single was "Care" with rapper T.I. and depending on the version, Martina McBride, Mary J. Blige or Angaleena Presley of the Pistol Annies.

Critical reception
Upon its release, Born Free received mixed reviews from most music critics. At Metacritic, which assigns a normalized rating out of 100 to reviews from mainstream critics, the album received an average score of 63, based on 10 reviews, which indicates "generally favorable reviews".

AllMusic praised Born Free, saying it "goes a long, long way toward keeping that heartland flame burning bright: it’s familiar yet fresh, and song for song it’s the best album Kid Rock has cut since Devil Without a Cause. This album was number 16 on Rolling Stones list of the 30 Best Albums of 2010.

Track listing

Target bonus tracks
 "Rock N Roll Jesus" (live)
 "Lowlife/Keep Your Hands To Yourself" (live)
 "Care" (Demo Version with Mary J. Blige)

Racing Father Time EP
 "The Midwest Fall"
 "Lonely Road of Faith" (Alt. version)
 "Slow My Roll" (Porch version)
 "Forty"

Sample credits
"Born Free" - "I Feel Fine" by The Beatles (Guitar)
"God Bless Saturday" - Get Back by The Beatles ( Guitar)
"Times Like These" - "Learn To Be Still" by Eagles (Acoustic Guitar)

Personnel
Kid Rock - lead vocals, guitar
Marlon Young - lead guitar
David Hidalgo - guitar
Matt Sweeney - guitar
Justin Meldal-Johnsen - bass
Lenny Castro - percussion 
Chad Smith - drums, percussion
Benmont Tench - keyboards, piano
Blake Mills - banjo, guitar

Additional personnel
Bob Seger - piano on "Collide"
Sheryl Crow - vocals on "Collide"
Zac Brown - vocals on "Flying High"
T.I. - vocals on "Care"
Martina McBride - vocals on "Care"
Mary J. Blige- vocals on " Care ( Demo Version)"
Trace Adkins- background vocals on "Rock Bottom Blues"

Charts

Weekly charts

Year-end charts

Certifications

References

2010 albums
Country albums by American artists
Heartland rock albums
Rock-and-roll albums
Kid Rock albums
Atlantic Records albums
Albums produced by Rick Rubin
Albums recorded at Shangri-La (recording studio)